Serigne Mountakha Mbacké (born 1930) is the current, and eighth, Caliph of the Mouride brotherhood, a large Sufi order based in Senegal. He assumed office in January 2018 after the death of the seventh Caliph, Serigne Sidi Moukhtar Mbacké. He is the oldest grandson of the founder of the brotherhood, Sheikh Ahmadou Bamba, who died in 1927, and the son of Serigne Mouhamadou Bassirou Mbacké ibn Khadim Rassoul.

References

Living people
Mouride caliphs
People from Touba, Senegal
21st-century caliphs
1930 births